Sony BBC Earth is an Indian pay television channel owned by BBC Studios and Culver Max Entertainment. The channel broadcasts BBC programming in English, Hindi, Tamil and Telugu through its four audio tracks available. The BBC entered into a joint venture with Multi Screen Media to launch the channel in India, which was finally launched on 6 March 2017, following regulatory approval of the joint venture.

See also
 BBC Earth (TV channel)

References

External links
 Sony BBC Earth Official Website
 Watch Sony BBC Earth LIVE on Sony Liv

International BBC television channels
Television stations in India
2017 establishments in Maharashtra
English-language television stations in India
Sony Pictures Television
Sony Pictures Networks India
Television channels and stations established in 2017